The sixth season of One Tree Hill, an American television series, began on September 1, 2008, and concluded on May 18, 2009, with a total of 24 episodes. This is the third season to air on The CW television network. The season's seventh episode, "Messin' with the Kid" achieved a series high in Adults 18–34 with a 2.7 rating.

Season six is the final season for original cast members Chad Michael Murray and Hilarie Burton. Their characters, Lucas and Peyton, leave Tree Hill with their newborn baby in the finale.

Overview
Season 6 begins by revealing the woman Lucas proposed to over the phone. Peyton is faced with difficult decision regarding her health. Nathan tries to make a comeback in basketball, Haley has to make a decision involving her career, Brooke takes in a young girl named Sam and deals with being attacked in her own store, and Dan spends time with Jamie as he waits on a heart transplant. Meanwhile, a movie producer named Julian Baker comes to Tree Hill and wants to make Lucas's book into a movie.

Cast and characters

Regular
 Chad Michael Murray as Lucas Scott (24 episodes)
 James Lafferty as Nathan Scott (24 episodes)
 Hilarie Burton as Peyton Sawyer Scott (24 episodes)
 Bethany Joy Galeotti as Haley James Scott (24 episodes)
 Sophia Bush as Brooke Davis (24 episodes)
 Paul Johansson as Dan Scott (13 episodes)
 Barbara Alyn Woods as Deb Lee (8 episodes)
 Antwon Tanner as Skills Taylor (14 episodes)
 Lee Norris as Mouth McFadden (15 episodes)
 Jackson Brundage as Jamie Scott (22 episodes)
 Lisa Goldstein as Millicent Huxtable (17 episodes)

Recurring
 Ashley Rickards as Sam Walker (19 episodes)
 Austin Nichols as Julian Baker (14 episodes)
 Kate Voegele as Mia Catalano (12 episodes)
 Stephen Colletti as Chase Adams (12 episodes)
 Burgess Jenkins as Bobby Irons (8 episodes)
 Daphne Zuniga as Victoria Davis (7 episodes)
Jaden Harmon as Andre Fields (7 episodes)
 Joe Manganiello as Owen Morello (7 episodes)
Michael May as Chuck Scolnik (7 episodes)
 Vaughn Wilson as Fergie Thompson (7 episodes) 
 Cullen Moss as Junk Moretti (6 episodes)
 Evan Peters as Jack Daniels (6 episodes)
 Kelsey Chow as Gigi Silveri (6 episodes)
 Allison Munn as Lauren (5 episodes)
 Robbie Jones as Quentin Fields (5 episodes)
 Torrey DeVitto as Carrie (5 episodes)
 James Van Der Beek as Adam Reese (4 episodes)
Katherine Landry as Madison (4 episodes)
Devin McGee as Xavier Daniels (3 episodes)
 John Doe as Mick Wolf (3 episodes)
Bradley Evans as Jerry (3 episodes)
 Ernest Waddell as Derek Sommers (2 episodes)
 Michaela McManus as Lindsey Strauss (2 episodes)
 Gregory Harrison as Paul Norris (2 episodes)
Kelley Davis as Chuck's Mom (1 episode)

Special Guest Star
 Barry Corbin as Whitey Durham (1 episode)
 Moira Kelly as Karen Roe (1 episode)

Episodes

Production
The CW announced on March 3, 2008, that One Tree Hill was renewed for a sixth season. It was later reported the season would consist of twenty-four episodes, making it the biggest episode order in the series.

Storylines
Brooke begins her battle with her mom, Victoria, who battles to claim Clothes Over Bro's. Lucas and the Ravens basketball team must come to terms with the death of the star player. Nathan begins his comeback, Haley also hits the recording studio, while Peyton and Lucas settle down and begin a family. Brooke, left broken and shaken after her attack, takes in foster child Sam, who was responsible for the attack, and the attacker also turned out to be Q's killer. Nanny Carrie returns, after hitting Dan with a car, and taking him hostage, she lures Haley and Jamie to her, and attacks them, only to be killed by Dan, after weeks of torture. Mouth and Millicent have dramas and depart, while newcomer Julian Baker, rocks Brooke's world and begins to turn Lucas' book into a movie. With Peyton's alarming pregnancy, Lucas' finally allows for a wedding, only for Peyton to collapse at home, and go into a coma. The season finale ends with Brooke and Julian declaring their love for one another, Nathan making it into the NBA, and Lucas and Peyton leave Tree Hill.

Reception
The season opened to 3.24 million viewers and a 1.7 Adults 18–49 rating. Episode 7 hit series highs in Adults 18–34 with a 2.7 rating, it also hit its second best numbers in The CW's target audience of Women 18–34 with a 4.0 rating. The episode also reached its highest Adults 18–49 rating of the season, with a 1.9. The finale was seen by 2.67 million viewers and achieved a 1.3 Adults 18–49.

DVD release
The DVD release of season six was released after the season has completed broadcast on television. It has been released in Region 1. As well as every episode from the season, the DVD release features bonus material such as audio commentaries on some episodes from the creator and cast, deleted scenes, gag reels and behind-the-scenes featurettes.

References

External links

Official website

One Tree Hill (TV series) seasons
2008 American television seasons
2009 American television seasons